BML may refer to:

Businesses and organizations
 Bank of Maldives Limited
 Big Mouth Loud, a member of the Global Professional Wrestling Alliance
 Bill Me Later, now PayPal Credit
 BML Munjal University, a university in Sidhrawali, Haryana, India

Libraries
 Biblioteca Medicea Laurenziana, a library in Florence, Italy
 Boston Medical Library, Boston, Massachusetts

Transportation
 Belfast and Moosehead Lake Railroad (1871–2007), Maine, U.S.
 Biham–Middleton–Levine traffic model
 Bramhall railway station, Stockport, Greater Manchester, England
 Brighton Main Line, a British railway line
 Brighton Main Line 2, a proposed extension of the Oxted line in southern England

Other uses
 Battle management language
 Big Maple Leaf, a gold coin produced by the Royal Canadian Mint in 2007
 Bingley Music Live, an annual music festival held in Myrtle Park, Bingley, West Yorkshire, England
 BML-190 (Indomethacin morpholinylamide), a drug used in scientific research
 Bray–Moss–Libby model, used in mathematics to describe premixed turbulent combustion
 Broadcast Markup Language (.bml), an XML-based standard
 The IATA code of Berlin Regional Airport in Berlin, New Hampshire, USA
 The postal code of Bormla, Malta